LFT may refer to:

Medicine and psychology
 Lateral flow test, an immunochromatography device
 Liver function tests, a hepatic blood panel
 Low frustration tolerance, the inability to tolerate stress

Miscellaneous science and technology
 Layer four traceroute, network analysis software
 Ligand field theory, of molecular orbitals
 Long fiber thermoplastic
 Luyten Five-Tenths catalogue, of stars

Music
 "LFT", a song on Avalanche (Quadron album)

Schools
 Lycée Français de Tananarive, Madagascar
 Lycée Français Toronto, Canada
 Lycée Français de Tripoli, Libya

Transportation
 Lafayette station (Louisiana), United States (Amtrak station code: LFT)
 Lafayette Regional Airport, United States (IATA code: LFT)